TonyBet is an international online gaming company providing sports betting, live betting and live gaming services. The TonyBet website offers a live gaming service allowing the players to place bets on lottery, casino, poker and other games live.

Established in 2011 TonyBet now operates by the UK and Estonian gaming licenses allowing the company to provide its services to the UK and Estonian market.

On September 8, 2016, TonyBet business in Lithuania was acquired by Swedish company Betsson, who agreed to pay €6 million for the company.

Products 

The company's online gaming supply features a wide range of products including live and pre-match sports betting as well as money lines on some of the biggest entertainment and political events like the Eurovision Song Contest, presidential elections, and even the end of the world.

TonyBet also offers live casino and slot gaming services provided by the biggest online casino developers Microgaming and NET/ENT. The website also runs Live Games giving the player a chance to bet on poker, casino, and lottery game outcomes.

The TonyBet online poker application offers the game of Open Face Chinese poker.

In June 2021, TonyBet announced its platform and content deal with Leander. The deal saw TonyBet add a roster of technology and content launched on the platform. This included many online games to add to Tonybets online product portfolio.

In November 2022, TonyBet has acquired a license to start offering their services for the Dutch market.

Sponsorships 

TonyBet controversially became a sponsor of the Lithuania men's national basketball team in 2010, controversially because TonyBet provides betting on basketball games and because in Lithuania gambling advertising is banned nationwide.

According to TonyBet, in 2013 it became the main sponsor for the team in a four-year deal, and also was sponsoring some of the leading basketball clubs of Lithuania and Estonia, an Estonian football club, and Lithuanian and Estonian volleyball associations.

TonyBet is one of the main sponsors of the Juta Racing team of the Porsche Carrera Cup GB. The company and the team signed a sponsorship deal before Juta Racing's debut season in the circuit in 2015.

Open Face Chinese Poker 

In December 2013 TonyBet launched its own online Open-face Chinese poker application allowing its clients to play the game for real money.

The software offers cash games, Sit and Go and multi-table tournaments played in a number of different game variations including Pineapple, Turbo, 2–7 Pineapple and Progressive Fantasy.

In December 2014 TonyBet hosted the first-ever live Open Face Chinese Poker World Championship as part of the Prague Poker Festival.

 The US chess master Jennifer Shahade won the €10,000 buy-in High Roller event
 The €1,000 buy-in Main Event attracted the record-breaking audience of 132 players and became the biggest live Open Face Chinese poker tournament in history. The Norwegian poker pro Mikal Blomlie became the first-ever Open Face Chinese poker World Champion.

References

External links 
 

Online gambling companies of the United Kingdom
Online poker companies